MartiniPlaza (formerly Martinihal Groningen) is an indoor arena located in Groningen, Netherlands. It is used as an exhibition complex, theater and sports arena. The arena is the home of the basketball team Donar and has a capacity of 4,350 people.

Concerts

Sport events

Gallery

References

Indoor arenas in the Netherlands
Basketball venues in the Netherlands
Sports venues in Groningen (city)